A Ragi (rāgī) is a Sikh musician who plays hymns (shabads) in different ragas as prescribed in the Sri Guru Granth Sahib. Guru Arjan Dev, the 5th Guru of the Sikhs, started the ragi tradition of amateur musicians, as he didn't want the Sikhs to depend on professionals for their connection to the divine with sacred music. Ragis now are often professional and have much knowledge of the scriptures. Thus, they are highly respected. However, they are not a privileged elite as some today see them -- rather, the ragi tradition was meant to bring musical experience of the Sikh scriptures to a layperson, without a middleman (or woman).

Today, the ragi tradition is slightly different than in the Guru's time. Music is often not sung in the correct raag and often does not use the Guru's instruments but rather relies heavily on the harmonium, brought by the British colonizers. The lines of the shabads before the rahaos are not emphasized as they are prescribed either. Today also there are no female ragis allowed in Sri Harimandir Sahib, the most important temple for Sikhs, which goes against the Sikh principle of gender equality. Now, some efforts are being made to revive Gurmat Sangeet, kirtan the way the Gurus prescribed it.

References

Further reading
 Encyclopaedia of Sikh Religion and Culture

Sikh terminology
Sikh music

pnb:حضور صاحب